Visions of Us on the Land is the twelfth studio album by American rock musician Damien Jurado. It was released on March 18, 2016, by Secretly Canadian. The album was announced on December 15, 2015 with the release of its first single, "Exit 353". The album marks the end of a trilogy of albums produced by Richard Swift.

Accolades

Track listing

References

2016 albums
Damien Jurado albums
Secretly Canadian albums
Albums produced by Richard Swift (singer-songwriter)